Fistful of Hollow is the ninth full-length album by Californian punk rock band Swingin' Utters. The title and cover of the album are references to Hatful of Hollow, by The Smiths.

Track listing

Personnel
 Johnny Bonnel (vocals)
 Darius Koski (guitar, vocals)
 Jack Dalrymple (guitar, vocals)
 Greg McEntee (drums)
 Miles Peck (bass, vocals)

References

External links
Official Swingin' Utters homepage
[ Swingin' Utters at Allmusic]

Swingin' Utters albums
Fat Wreck Chords albums
2014 albums